Coupler Run is a  long 2nd order tributary to Montgomery Run in Clearfield County, Pennsylvania.  This is the only stream of this name in the United States.

Course 
Coupler Run rises about 5 miles east-southeast of Rockton, Pennsylvania, and then flows north and northwest to join Montgomery Run about 3 miles northeast of Rockton.

Watershed 
Coupler Run drains  of area, receives about 46.2 in/year of precipitation, has a wetness index of 452.11, and is about 95% forested.

See also 
 List of Pennsylvania Rivers

References

Watershed Maps 

Rivers of Pennsylvania
Rivers of Clearfield County, Pennsylvania